Jersey City station may refer to:

 the Central Railroad of New Jersey Terminal in Jersey City, New Jersey
 Exchange Place station (Pennsylvania Railroad), the Pennsylvania Railroad station in Jersey City, New Jersey
 the Pavonia Terminal, the Erie Railroad station in Jersey City, New Jersey